"He Ain't Heavy, He's My Uncle" is an episode of the BBC sitcom Only Fools and Horses. It was the fifth episode of series 7, and was first broadcast on 27 January 1991. In the episode, Uncle Albert comes home claiming to have been mugged and, thinking he has become a burden, decides to leave Nelson Mandela House.

Synopsis
There is an over-60s night happening at the Nag's Head, and Albert wants to dance with Marlene's mother, Dora Lane. Meanwhile, because of Raquel's pregnancy, and a spate of recent muggings on the estate, Del Boy decides that it is time to become a two-car family again. He purchases a green 1977 Ford Capri Ghia from Boycie for £400. Unbeknownst to Del, the car was a trade-in on the verge of being sent to be crushed before Boycie sold it to him. Rodney is unimpressed with the vehicle and secretly refers to it as the "Green Pratmobile". Rodney attempts to look for another full-time job, though Raquel and Del remind him that his prospects are bleak, due to him being unregistered for income tax and National Insurance for ten years. However to raise his spirits, Del reinstates Rodney back into Trotters Independent Traders.

That night, at the Nag's Head, Albert play dominoes with his friend and rival, Knock-Knock, with the both of them battling for the affections of Dora. The Trotters also notice a gang of skinheads in the background.

Two hours later, back at Nelson Mandela House, Del tells Raquel that he bought the Capri Ghia to drive her everywhere safely. Just then, Rodney rushes in and tells them that Albert has been mugged and his money and pocket watch have been stolen. Later, Albert, now sporting a black eye, is laid out on the settee. Del wants to get revenge on the muggers, but Raquel tells him to leave it to the police. Cassandra enters, and Albert tells her the story. In the kitchen, Cassandra and Rodney talk about Rodney's future with Trotters Independent Traders, and Cassandra leaves after believing that Rodney is becoming more like Del.

A week has passed since Albert's mugging, and he still has not left the flat. When looking through his old treasure chest of memories, he shows Del and Raquel a photograph of where he and Grandad were born: Tobacco Road, which has since been demolished. Rodney enters the flat, and he and Del talk about the doctor wanting Albert to try and return to normal life. Albert enters, and Del yells at him to get over his fear of going outside. The next morning, Albert runs away from home and leaves a note to his family: "I won't get under your feet any more. Your loving uncle, Albert." Raquel suggests that the Trotter brothers go out and look for Albert. Rodney takes the van, while Del takes the Capri Ghia – Rodney accidentally revealing that he calls the Capri the "Pratmobile".

Eventually, they find him at a luxury housing development on Tobacco Road. Del and Rodney apologise to Albert for yelling at him the previous night. Albert tells them about his childhood in Tobacco Road and his first job at the age of fifteen on a tramp steamer. He laments the fact that the old neighbourhood has been torn down for the housing development, while Del thinks of it as a huge improvement and starts to wax lyrical about what he plans to do when he can afford to move there. Rodney takes Albert home in the van, leaving Del alone to stare dreamily across the waters.

Back at the flat, Albert has regained his confidence. Just then, Knock-Knock rings the doorbell; Albert answers it and tries to escape to his bedroom. Del speaks to Knock-Knock instead, and returns with Albert's pocket watch, which is what Knock-Knock wanted to return. Del has found out the truth: Albert was not mugged, he and Knock-Knock had had a fight over Marlene's mother, and Knock-Knock had knocked Albert out, and had also hit him in the eye. Albert also lost all of his money at dominoes to Knock-Knock, so to avoid embarrassment made up the mugging story.

Rodney enters and tells everyone that the skinheads in the pub were actually undercover police officers who had been placed on the estate following the recent muggings, and a biker gang was arrested for assaulting them. Del's heart sinks and he admits that he asked the bikers to do it as a favour, since he knows their leader, and believed that they were responsible for mugging Albert. As they discuss the possible repercussions, Albert confidently boasts about how he will beat them all. In a rage, Del attempts to hit Albert, but Rodney restrains him.

Episode cast

Notes 

 The title of the episode is derived from the song "He Ain't Heavy, He's My Brother".

Music
 Paul & Linda McCartney: "Uncle Albert/Admiral Halsey"

External links

1991 British television episodes
Only Fools and Horses (series 7) episodes